Chamdo, officially Qamdo and also known in Chinese as Changdu, is a prefecture-level city in the eastern part of the Tibet Autonomous Region, China. Its seat is the town of Chengguan in Karuo District. Chamdo is Tibet's third largest city after Lhasa and Shigatse.

Chamdo is  divided into 11 county-level divisions: one district and ten counties. The main district is  Karuo District. Other  counties include Jonda County, Gonjo County, Riwoche County, Dengqen County, Zhag'yab County, Baxoi County, Zognang County, Maarkam County, Lhorong County, and Banbar County.

History 
On 11 July 2014 Chamdo Prefecture was upgraded into a prefecture-level city.

Languages
Languages spoken in Chamdo include Khams Tibetan and the Chamdo languages of Lamo, Larong, and Drag-yab.

Transportation

Air
The long commute (2.5 hours by mountain road) is the result of no flat land closer to the city being available to construct an airport.

Road
China National Highway 214 and China National Highway 317 are the main roads in and out of Chamdo.

Subdivisions

The city is subdivided into 11 county-level divisions: 1 district and 10 counties

Climate 
Chamdo has a humid continental climate (Köppen: Dwb) in the Karub District and an alpine subarctic climate (Köppen: Dwc) in other counties.

References

External links
 

 
Prefecture-level divisions of Tibet